This article lists the leaders of the TBVC states, the four Bantustans which were declared nominally independent by the government of the Republic of South Africa during the period of apartheid, which lasted from 1948 to 1994. Their independence was not recognized outside South Africa.

The bantustans with nominal independence were namely: Transkei (1976), Bophuthatswana (1977), Venda (1979) and Ciskei (1981), hence the abbreviation TBVC.

The TBVC states were reintegrated into South Africa after the first post-apartheid general election in 1994.

List

Transkei

Heads of state

Heads of government

Foreign ministers

Bophuthatswana

Heads of state and government

Foreign ministers

Venda

Heads of state and government

Foreign ministers

Ciskei

Heads of state and government

Foreign ministers

See also
 Bantu Authorities Act, 1951
 Promotion of Bantu Self-government Act, 1959
 Bantu Homelands Citizenship Act, 1970
 Bantu Homelands Constitution Act, 1971

Notes

References

External links
 World Statesmen – South Africa (South African Homelands)

Political office-holders in the South African bantustans
Heads of state of South African bantustans
Chief ministers of South African bantustans
South Africa history-related lists
Lists of South African people
TBVC